Garba Mohammed (15 April 1944 – 10 April 2021) was appointed Governor of Sokoto State in Nigeria from August 1985 to December 1987 during the military regime of General Ibrahim Babangida.

References

1944 births
2021 deaths
Nigerian generals
Nigerian military governors of Sokoto State